is a railway station in Kita-ku, Hamamatsu,  Shizuoka Prefecture, Japan, operated by the third sector Tenryū Hamanako Railroad.

Lines
Higashi-Tsuzuki Station is served by the Tenryū Hamanako Line, and is located 51.9 kilometers from the starting point of the line at Kakegawa Station.

Station layout
The station has a single side platform, with a small weather shelter built adjacent to the platform. The station is unattended.

Adjacent stations

|-
!colspan=5|Tenryū Hamanako Railroad

Station history
Higashi-Tsuzuki Station was established on July 8, 1953 as a station of the Japan National Railways Futamata Line. After the privatization of JNR on March 15, 1987, the station came under the control of the Tenryū Hamanako Line.

Passenger statistics
In fiscal 2016, the station was used by an average of 39 passengers daily (boarding passengers only).

Surrounding area
Lake Hamana
Tōmei Expressway

See also
 List of Railway Stations in Japan

References

External links

  Tenryū Hamanako Railroad Station information 
 

Railway stations in Shizuoka Prefecture
Railway stations in Japan opened in 1953
Stations of Tenryū Hamanako Railroad
Railway stations in Hamamatsu